Route 380 or Highway 380 may refer to:

Canada
New Brunswick Route 380
Newfoundland and Labrador Route 380

Japan
 Japan National Route 380

United States
  Interstate 380
  U.S. Route 380
  Arizona State Route 380 (cancelled proposal)
  Arkansas Highway 380
  Georgia State Route 380
  Louisiana Highway 380
  Maryland Route 380
  New York State Route 380 (former)
  Ohio State Route 380
  Oregon Route 380
  Pennsylvania Route 380
  Puerto Rico Highway 380
  Tennessee State Route 380